The New York Open was an ATP indoor hard court tennis tournament held in Uniondale, New York, United States. The event took place at the Nassau Veterans Memorial Coliseum. The tournament was created in 2018 to replace the Memphis Open, which was canceled due to lack of sponsorship. It was described as "home of the black court", despite the court colour being patently grey. In 2022, the tournament was moved to Dallas, Texas, and rechristened the Dallas Open.

Finals

Singles

Doubles

References

External links

 
 ATP tournament profile

 
Tennis tournaments in New York (state)
Hard court tennis tournaments
Recurring sporting events established in 2018
ATP Tour 250
2018 establishments in New York (state)
Sports in Hempstead, New York
Indoor tennis tournaments
Professional sports leagues in the United States